John Pinto  (December 15, 1924 – May 24, 2019) was an American politician. He served as a Democratic member of the New Mexico Senate from 1977 until his death in 2019.

Early life 
Pinto was born in Lupton, Arizona, on the Navajo Nation. He earned a Bachelor of Science and Master of Arts degree from the University of New Mexico.

Career 
Pinto served in the United States Marine Corps during World War II and was a Navajo code talker. After leaving the military, Pinto was a teacher and organizer for the National Education Association. Elected to the New Mexico Senate in 1977, Pinto represented the 3rd district, which includes the Four Corners-area and spans much of western San Juan County, as well as a portion of western McKinley County. Much of the district is made up of the Navajo Nation and includes Shiprock, Sheep Springs, and part of Gallup. At 94, he was the longest-serving member in the Senate.

Personal life 
He died in office in Gallup, New Mexico, on May 24, 2019 at the age of 94. He was succeeded in office by his granddaughter, Shannon Pinto.

References

External links
 John Pinto at Vote Smart
 Follow the Money – John Pinto
 2008 2006 2004 2002 2000 1996 1992 campaign contributions

1924 births
2019 deaths
Navajo Nation politicians
Native American state legislators in New Mexico
Democratic Party New Mexico state senators
People from McKinley County, New Mexico
21st-century American politicians
People from Apache County, Arizona
Military personnel from Arizona
Navajo code talkers
University of New Mexico alumni
20th-century American politicians
United States Marine Corps personnel of World War II
20th-century Native Americans
21st-century Native Americans